"Fuel" is a song by American heavy metal band Metallica. The song was written by James Hetfield, Lars Ulrich, and Kirk Hammett, and was released as the third single from their seventh album, Reload. The song was nominated for a Grammy Award for Best Hard Rock Performance in 1999 but lost to Jimmy Page and Robert Plant for the song "Most High". It was moderately successful on the music charts, peaking at number two in Australia, number three in Hungary, number five in Finland and number six on the US Billboard Mainstream Rock chart.

Metallica have frequently played "Fuel" in concerts over the years, including the 1999 live album S&M with Michael Kamen conducting the San Francisco Symphony Orchestra.

The demo version of this song called "Fuel for Fire" (with different lyrics) was used as the theme song for NASCAR on NBC from 2001 until the 2004 Daytona 500.

Track listings
All live tracks were recorded on April 20, 1998, at the Brisbane Entertainment Centre, Brisbane, Australia.

UK and Australasian CD1
 "Fuel" – 4:29
 "Sad but True" (live) – 6:23
 "Nothing Else Matters" – 6:08

UK and Australasian CD2
 "Fuel" – 4:29
 "Wherever I May Roam" – 6:48
 "One" – 8:06

UK and Australasian CD3
 "Fuel" – 4:30
 "Until It Sleeps" (live) – 4:25
 "Fuel" (live) – 4:40
 "Fuel" (demo) – 4:25

European CD single
 "Fuel" – 4:29
 "Sad but True" (live) – 6:23

Japanese maxi-CD single
 "Fuel" – 4:30
 "Fuel" (live) – 4:39
 "Sad but True" (live) – 6:24
 "Until It Sleeps" (live) – 4:26
 "One" (live) – 8:07
" Fuel" (demo) – 4:26

Charts and certifications

Weekly charts

Year-end charts

Certifications

Release history

References

External links
 

1997 songs
1998 singles
Elektra Records singles
Mercury Records singles
Metallica songs
Music videos directed by Wayne Isham
Song recordings produced by Bob Rock
Songs written by James Hetfield
Songs written by Kirk Hammett
Songs written by Lars Ulrich
Vertigo Records singles